Siaka Haidara (born 13 May 2001) is a Malian-born Italian professional footballer who plays as a winger for Italian Serie D club Spinea.

References

2001 births
Living people
Italian footballers
Super League Greece 2 players
Panserraikos F.C. players
Association football wingers